A first aid kit or medical kit is a collection of supplies and equipment used to give immediate medical treatment, primarily to treat injuries and other mild or moderate medical conditions. There is a wide variation in the contents of first aid kits based on the knowledge and experience of those putting it together, the differing first aid requirements of the area where it may be used, and variations in legislation or regulation in a given area.

The international standard for first aid kits is that they should be identified with the ISO graphical symbol for first aid (from ISO 7010), which is an equal white cross on a green background.

Standard kits often come in durable plastic boxes, fabric pouches or in wall mounted cabinets. The type of container will vary depending on the purpose, and they range in size from wallet-sized through to a large box. It is recommended that all kits are kept in a clean dust- and damp-proof container to keep the contents safe and aseptic. 

Kits should be checked regularly and restocked if any items are damaged or are out of date.

Appearance
The International Organization for Standardization (ISO) sets a standard for first aid kits of being green, with a white cross, in order to make them easily recognizable to anyone requiring first aid.

The ISO only endorses the use of the green background and white cross, and this has been adopted as a standard across many countries and regions, including the entire EU. First aid kits are sometimes marked (by an individual or organization) with a red cross on white background, but use of this symbol by anyone but the International Committee of the Red Cross (ICRC) or associated agency is illegal under the terms of the First Geneva Convention, which designates the red cross as a protected symbol in all countries signatory to it. One of the few exceptions is in North America, where despite the passing of the First Geneva convention in 1864, and its ratification in the United States in 1881, Johnson & Johnson has used the red cross as a mark on its products since 1887 and registered the symbol as a U.S. trademark for medicinal and surgical plasters in 1905.

Some first aid kits may also feature the Star of Life, normally associated with emergency medical services, but which are also used to indicate that the service using it can offer an appropriate point of care. Though not supported by the ISO, a white cross on red background is also widely recognized as a first aid symbol. However, for very small medical institutions and domestic purposes, the white cross on a plain green background is preferred.

Contents of first aid kits

Commercially available first aid kits available via normal retail routes have traditionally been intended for treatment of minor injuries only. Typical contents include adhesive bandages, regular strength pain medication, gauze and low grade disinfectant. 

Specialized first aid kits are available for various regions, vehicles or activities, which may focus on specific risks or concerns related to the activity. For example, first aid kits sold through marine supply stores for use in watercraft may contain seasickness remedies.

Airway, breathing and circulation
First aid treats the ABCs as the foundation of good treatment. For this reason, most modern commercial first aid kits (although not necessarily those assembled at home) will contain a suitable infection barrier for performing artificial respiration as part of cardiopulmonary resuscitation, examples include:
Pocket mask
Face shield

Advanced first aid kits may also contain items such as:
Oropharyngeal airway
Nasopharyngeal airway
Bag valve mask
Manual aspirator or suction unit
Sphygmomanometer (blood pressure cuff)
Stethoscope

Some first aid kits, specifically those used by event first aiders and emergency services, include bottled oxygen for resuscitation and therapy.

Common items

Common kits may contain:
 Thermometer 
 Adhesive dressings
 Antiseptic solution (most commonly povidone iodine or hydrogen peroxide)
 Bandages
 Cotton balls or swabs
 Emergency blanket
 Gauze
 Gloves
 Hand sanitizer
 Ice pack
 Saline
 Tweezers

Trauma injuries
Trauma injuries, such as bleeding, bone fractures or burns, are usually the main focus of most first aid kits, with items such as bandages and dressings being found in the vast majority of all kits.
Adhesive bandages (band-aids, sticking plasters) - can include ones shaped for particular body parts, such as knuckles
Moleskin – for blister treatment and prevention
Dressings (sterile, applied directly to the wound)
Sterile eye pads
Sterile gauze pads
Sterile non-adherent pads, containing a non-stick teflon layer
Petrolatum gauze pads, used as an occlusive (air-tight) dressing for sucking chest wounds, as well as a non-stick dressing
Bandages (for securing dressings, not necessarily sterile)
Gauze roller bandages – absorbent, breathable, and often elastic
Elastic bandages – used for sprains, and pressure bandages
Adhesive, elastic roller bandages (commonly called 'Vet wrap') – very effective pressure bandages and durable, waterproof bandaging
Triangular bandages – used as slings, tourniquets, to tie splints, and many other uses
Butterfly closure strips – used like stitches to close wounds, usually only included for higher level response as can seal in infection in uncleaned wounds.
Saline – used for cleaning wounds or washing out foreign bodies from eyes
Soap – used with water to clean superficial wounds once bleeding is stopped
Antiseptic wipes or sprays for reducing the risk of infection in abrasions or around wounds. Dirty wounds must be cleaned for antiseptics to be effective.
Burn dressing, which is usually a sterile pad soaked in a cooling gel
Adhesive tape, hypoallergenic
Hemostatic agents may be included in first aid kits, especially military, combat or tactical kits, to promote clotting for severe bleeding.

Personal protective equipment

The use of personal protective equipment or PPE will vary by the kit, depending on its use and anticipated risk of infection. The adjuncts to artificial respiration are covered above, but other common infection control PPE includes:
Gloves which are single-use and disposable to prevent cross infection
Goggles or other eye protection
Surgical mask or N95 mask to reduce the possibility of airborne infection transmission (sometimes placed on patient instead of caregivers. For this purpose the mask should not have an exhale valve)
Apron

Instruments and equipment
Trauma shears for cutting clothing and general use
Scissors are less useful but often included (usually to cut medical equipment off or smaller)
Tweezers, for removing splinters, amongst others.
Lighter for sanitizing tweezers or pliers etc.
Alcohol pads for sanitizing equipment, or unbroken skin. This is sometimes used to debride wounds, however some training authorities advise against this as it may kill cells which bacteria can then feed on
Irrigation syringe – with catheter tip for cleaning wounds with sterile water, saline solution, or a weak iodine solution. The stream of liquid flushes out particles of dirt and debris.
Torch (also known as a flashlight)
Instant-acting chemical cold packs
Alcohol rub (hand sanitizer) or antiseptic hand wipes
Thermometer
Space blanket (lightweight plastic foil blanket, also known as "emergency blanket")
Penlight
Cotton swab
Cotton wool, for applying antiseptic lotions.
Safety pins, for pinning bandages.

Medication
Medication can be a controversial addition to a first aid kit, especially if it is for use on members of the public.  It is, however, common for personal or family first aid kits to contain certain medications. Dependent on scope of practice, the main types of medicine are life saving medications, which may be commonly found in first aid kits used by paid or assigned first aiders for members of the public or employees, painkillers, which are often found in personal kits, but may also be found in public provision and lastly symptomatic relief medicines, which are generally only found in personal kits.

Life saving
Aspirin primarily used for central medical chest pain as an anti-platelet
Epinephrine autoinjector (brand name Epipen) – often included in kits for wilderness use and in places such as summer camps, to temporarily reduce airway swelling in the event of anaphylactic shock. Note that epinephrine does not treat the anaphylactic shock itself; it only opens the airway to prevent suffocation and allow time for other treatments to be used or help to arrive. The effects of epinephrine (adrenaline) are short-lived, and swelling of the throat may return, requiring the use of additional epipens until other drugs can take effect, or more advanced airway methods (such as intubation) can be established.
Diphenhydramine (brand name Benadryl) – Used to treat or prevent anaphylactic shock. Best administered as soon as symptoms appear when impending anaphylactic shock is suspected. Once the airway is restricted, oral drugs can no longer be administered until the airway is clear again, such as after the administration of an epipen. A common recommendation for adults is to take two 25mg pills. Non-solid forms of the drug, such as liquid or dissolving strips, may be absorbed more rapidly than tablets or capsules, and therefore more effective in an emergency.

Pain killers
Paracetamol (also known as acetaminophen) is one of the most common pain-killing medications, as either tablet or syrup.
Anti-inflammatory painkillers such as ibuprofen, naproxen or other NSAIDs can be used as part of treating pain from injuries such as sprains, strains and bone fractures.
Codeine is both a painkiller and anti-diarrheal.

Symptomatic relief

 Anti diarrhea medication such as loperamide – especially important in remote or third world locations where dehydration caused by diarrhea is a leading killer of children
 Oral rehydration salts
Antihistamine, such as diphenhydramine
Poison treatments
Absorption, such as activated charcoal, Enterosgel and Atoxyl.
Emetics to induce vomiting, such as syrup of ipecac although first aid manuals now advise against inducing vomiting.
Smelling salts (ammonium carbonate)

Topical medications
Antiseptics / disinfectants
Antiseptic fluid, moist wipe or spray – For cleaning and disinfecting a wound. Typically benzalkonium chloride, which disinfects wounds with minimal stinging or harm to exposed tissue. Can also be used as an antibacterial hand wipe for the person providing aid.
Povidone iodine is an antiseptic in the form of liquid, swabstick, or towelette. Can be used in a weak dilution of clean water to prepare an irrigation solution for cleaning a wound.
 Hydrogen peroxide is often included in home first aid kits, but is a poor choice for disinfecting wounds- it kills cells and delays healing
Alcohol pads – sometimes included for disinfecting instruments or unbroken skin (for example prior to draining a blister), or cleaning skin prior to applying an adhesive bandage. Alcohol should not be used on an open wound, as it kills skin cells and delays healing.
Medicated antiseptic ointments- for preventing infection in a minor wound, after it is cleaned. Not typically used on wounds that are bleeding heavily. Ointments typically contain one, two, or all three of the following antibacterial ingredients (those containing all three are typically called 'triple-antibiotic ointment') neomycin, polymyxin B sulfate or bacitracin zinc.
Burn gel – a water-based gel that acts as a cooling agent and often includes a mild anaesthetic such as lidocaine and, sometimes, an antiseptic such as tea tree oil
Anti-itch ointment
Hydrocortisone cream
antihistamine cream containing diphenhydramine
Calamine lotion, for skin inflammations.
Anti-fungal cream
Tincture of benzoin – often in the form of an individually sealed swabstick or ampule, protects the skin and aids the adhesion of adhesive bandages, such as moleskin, Band-Aids, or wound closure ('butterfly') strips. Benzoin swabsticks are very prone to leaking and making a mess when kept in portable first aid kits; ampules are a more durable option. If swabsticks are used, it is advisable to keep them in a sealed zip lock bag.

Improvised uses
Besides the regular uses for first aid kits, they can be helpful in wilderness or survival situations. First aid kits can make up a part of a survival kit or a mini survival kit in addition to other tools.

Workplace first aid kits
In the United States, the Occupational Safety and Health Administration (OSHA) requires all job sites and workplaces to make available first aid equipment for use by injured employees. While providing regulations for some industries such as logging, in general the regulation lacks specifics on the contents of the first aid kit. This is understandable, as the regulation covers every means of employment, and different jobs have different types of injuries and different first-aid requirements. However, in a non-mandatory section, the OSHA regulations do refer to ANSI/ISEA Specification Z308.1 as the basis for the suggested minimum contents of a first aid kit.  Another source for modern first aid kit information is United States Forest Service Specification 6170-6, which specifies the contents of several different-sized kits, intended to serve groups of differing size.

In general, the type of first aid facilities required in a workplace are determined by many factors, such as:
 the laws and regulation of the state or territory in which it is located;
 the type of industry concerned; for example, industries such as mining may have specific industry regulations detailing specialised instructions;
 the type of hazards present in the workplace;
 the number of employees in the workplace;
 the number of different locations that the workplace is spread over;
 the proximity to local services (doctors, hospital, ambulance).

Historic first aid kits

As the understanding of first aid and lifesaving measures has advanced, and the nature of public health risks has changed, the contents of first aid kits have changed to reflect prevailing understandings and conditions. For example, earlier US Federal specifications for first aid kits included incision/suction-type snakebite kits and mercurochrome antiseptic. There are many historic components no longer used today, of course; some notable examples follow. As explained in the article on snakebite, the historic snakebite kit is no longer recommended. Mercurochrome was removed in 1998 by the US FDA from the generally recognized as safe category due to concerns over its mercury content. Another common item in early 20th century first aid kits, picric acid gauze for treating burns, is today considered a hazardous material due to its forming unstable and potentially explosive picrates when in contact with metal. Examples of modern additions include the CPR face shields and specific body-fluid barriers included in modern kits to assist in CPR and to help prevent the spread of bloodborne pathogens such as HIV.

See also 
 First aid
 IFAK (individual first aid kit), US military equipment 
 Bug-out bag
 Medical bag
 Injury
 Emergency

References

External links 

How to make your own first-aid kit, Centers for Disease Control and Prevention
Red Cross' Anatomy of a First Aid Kit

Kit
Camping equipment
Medical equipment